Muhammad Shehzad Arbab is a retired Pakistani civil servant who  served as Advisor to Prime Minister Imran Khan on Establishment from August 2018 to 10 April 2022. Before his retirement from civil services, Arbab served in BPS-22 grade as the Commerce Secretary of Pakistan and Chief Secretary Khyber Pakhtunkhwa. He belongs to the Pakistan Administrative Service and is batchmates with Tariq Bajwa, Babar Yaqoob Fateh Muhammad and Sajjad Saleem Hotiana.

A member of the eminent Arbab family of the Khyber Pakhtunkhwa province, Shehzad Arbab is known for having played a key role in the FATA reforms of 2017 during his tenure as Federal Secretary SAFRON. He has previously also served as Chief Secretary Azad Kashmir and Additional Secretary at Aiwan-e-Sadr.

Personal life
Arbab is son of Arbab Niaz Muhammad, former Pakistan Army officer who served as a member of President Zia-ul-Haq's cabinet in the capacity as Minister for Culture. The international cricket stadium in Peshawar, Arbab Niaz Stadium, is named after Arbab Niaz.

See also
Nasir Mahmood Khosa
Tariq Bajwa
Jawad Rafique Malik
Rizwan Ahmed
Rabiya Javeri Agha
Nargis Sethi
Fawad Hasan Fawad
Syed Abu Ahmad Akif
Allah Bakhsh Malik

References 

Living people
Pakistani civil servants
Government of Pakistan
Pakistani government officials
Year of birth missing (living people)